Basketball at the 1948 Summer Olympics was the second appearance of the sport of basketball as an official Olympic medal event. A total number of 23 nations entered the competition.

Olympic basketball returned to indoor competition in Harringay Arena, after the disastrous weather conditions of the final game in the 1936 Summer Olympics.

Format
In the preliminary rounds, teams were divided into 3 groups of 6 squads and a group with 5 squads.
The preliminary round was played in a single round-robin format
The Group tournament ranking system was observed as follows:

Ties were broken by the ratio of points scored to points allowed.
After the preliminaries, the top 2 teams in each group will advance to the final round.
The 4 remaining teams went to their respective classification playoffs.

Medalists

Participating teams

Playoff berths for the Tournament

Results

Preliminary round

Group A

 Uruguay def. Great Britain, 69–17
 Brazil def. Hungary, 45–41
 Canada def. Italy, 55–37
 Brazil def. Uruguay, 36–32
 Canada def. Great Britain, 44–24
 Hungary def. Italy, 32–19
 Brazil def. Great Britain, 76–11
 Hungary def. Canada, 37–36
 Uruguay def. Italy, 46–34
 Italy def. Great Britain, 49–28
 Uruguay def. Hungary, 49–31
 Brazil def. Canada, 57–35
 Hungary def. Great Britain, 60–23
 Brazil def. Italy, 47–31
 Canada def. Uruguay, 52–50

Group B

|}

 Philippines def. Iraq, 102–30
 Korea def. Belgium, 29–27
 Chile def. China, 44–39
 Chile def. Iraq, 100–18
 Philippines def. Korea, 35–33
 China def. Belgium, 36–34
 Chile def. Philippines, 68–39
 Belgium def. Iraq, 98–20
 China def. Korea, 49–48
 Belgium def. Chile, 38–36
 Korea def. Iraq, 120–20
 Philippines def. China, 51–32
 Belgium def. Philippines, 35–34
 China def. Iraq, 125–25
 Korea def. Chile, 28–21

Group C

|}

 United States def. Switzerland, 86–21
 Czechoslovakia def. Peru, 38–30
 Argentina def. Egypt, 57–38
 Peru def. Egypt, 52–27
 Argentina def. Switzerland, 49–23
 United States def. Czechoslovakia, 53–28
 Peru def. Switzerland, 49–19
 United States def. Argentina, 59–57
 Czechoslovakia def. Egypt, 52–38
 United States def. Egypt, 66–28
 Czechoslovakia def. Switzerland, 54–28
 Argentina def. Peru, 42–34
 Egypt def. Switzerland, 31–29
 United States def. Peru, 61–33
 Czechoslovakia def. Argentina, 45–41

Group D

|}

 France def. Iran, 62–30
 Mexico def. Cuba, 39–31
 Mexico def. Ireland, 71–9
 France def. Cuba, 37–31
 Mexico def. France, 56–42
 Iran def. Ireland, 49–22
 Mexico def. Iran, 68–27
 Cuba def. Ireland, 88–25
 Cuba def. Iran, 63–30
 France def. Ireland, 73–14

17th-23rd place classification playoffs

Classification 21st-23rd 

Since the total number of competitors of the tournament was not a power of 2, a bye was given to Egypt, meaning they advanced to the classification semifinals. Also, Ireland was deemed to have finished last, due to the loss to Switzerland and a bye they earned from Iraq.

9th-16th place classification playoffs

Classification 13th-16th 

Hungary forfeited all of the matches in this round as indicated above.

Final round

Classification 5th-8th

Boxscores

17th–23rd place quarterfinals

21st–23rd place semifinal

17th–20th place semifinals

9th–16th place quarterfinals

13th–16th place semifinals

9th–12th place semifinals

Quarterfinals

5th–8th place semifinals

Semifinals

Final classification matches

21st place match

19th place match

17th place match

15th place match

13th place match

11th place match

9th place match

7th place match

5th place match

Bronze medal match

Gold medal match

Awards

Participating nations
For the team rosters see: Basketball at the 1948 Summer Olympics – Men's team squads.

Each country was allowed to enter one team of up to 14 players and they all were eligible for participation (with a maximum of five on the court at any given moment). A total of 298(*) basketball players from 23 nations competed at the London Games:

 
 
 
 
 
 
 
 
 
 
 
 (**)
 
 
 
 
 
 
 
 
 
 
 

(*) NOTE: There are only players counted, which participated in one game at least, according to the official report, because the rosters for the matches are unknown. It is also unknown up to now, if there were more reserve players.

(*) and (**) It is uncertain if P. Benedek and J. Verbenyi played for Hungary in this tournament. The official report shows them, but Hungarian sources did not, however they are counted.

Summary

References

External links
Official Olympic Report

 
Basketball in London
1948
1948 in basketball
International basketball competitions hosted by the United Kingdom